Barclay White (April 4, 1821 – November 23, 1906) was Superintendent of Indian Affairs during the administration of American president Ulysses S. Grant, a published authority on the history of West Jersey and the genealogy of local families, and a pioneering New Jersey cranberry farmer.

Barclay White was born of Quaker parentage at Philadelphia, Pennsylvania to Joseph White (December 28, 1785 – May 25, 1827) and Rebecca Smith, his wife. His father and uncle, Josiah White, were prominent entrepreneurs. He became an orphan at the age of six. White was educated at Westtown School, Westtown, Pennsylvania, and Smith's Academy, Wilmington, Delaware.

White lived for many years on his farm at Springfield Township, Burlington County, New Jersey. He was married three times, fathering five sons. The children of Barclay and Rebecca Merritt (Lamb) White were: Howard, born April 12, 1844; Joseph Josiah, born January 22, 1846; George Foster, born November 13, 1847; and Barclay Jr., born February 20, 1850, and with his second wife, Beulah, Daniel Smith White born 1853. Joseph J. White's daughter, Elizabeth Coleman White, pioneered the development and commercialization of the cultivated blueberry.

Barclay White died at Mount Holly Township, New Jersey and was interred at Arney's Mount Friends Meetinghouse and Burial Ground, Springfield Township.

References

Bibliography
 White, Joseph J. (1870). Cranberry culture. New York: Orange Judd & Co.

External links
 Biography of Joseph White Based on information provided by Barclay White, recorded by Thomas Shourds, and published in History and genealogy of Fenwick's Colony, New Jersey.
 Find A Grave Memorial for Barclay White
 Early Settlements in Springfield Township, Burlington County, N.J. by Barclay White

1821 births
1906 deaths
American Quakers
People from Mount Holly, New Jersey
People from Springfield Township, Burlington County, New Jersey
Politicians from Philadelphia
American genealogists
Historians from Pennsylvania
Historians from New Jersey